Nayong Pilipino may refer to:

Nayong Pilipino Foundation, state-owned corporation which ran cultural parks.
Old Nayong Pilipino, defunct cultural theme park in Pasay
Nayong Pilipino Clark, cultural theme park in Pampanga
Nayong Pilipino Cultural Park and Creative Hub, planned cultural theme park in Parañaque